Conservative Mainstream is a pressure group on the left of the British Conservative Party, advocating centrist views.

It was founded in 1996.  It is now aligned closely to the Tory Reform Group and the Conservative Europe Group.  Its chairman is Damian Green MP.

External links
Conservative Mainstream website

Organisations associated with the Conservative Party (UK)
1996 establishments in the United Kingdom